Mothers & Daughters is a 1997 studio album by Rosemary Clooney.

Track listing 
 "Thank Heaven for Little Girls" (Alan Jay Lerner, Frederick Loewe) – 3:28
 "Always" (Irving Berlin) – 3:44
 "That Face" (Alan Bergman, Lew Spence) – 3:06
 "Baby Mine" (Frank Churchill, Ned Washington) – 4:27
 "The Best Gift" (Lan O'Kun) – 2:00
 "Maria" (Leonard Bernstein, Stephen Sondheim) – 3:28
 "God Bless the Child" (Arthur Herzog, Jr., Billie Holiday) – 4:33
 "Look to the Rainbow" (Yip Harburg, Burton Lane) – 2:36
 "Turn Around" (Harry Belafonte, Alan Greene, Malvina Reynolds) – 3:13
 "Hello, Young Lovers" (Oscar Hammerstein II, Richard Rodgers) – 2:13
 "Wrap Your Troubles in Dreams (and Dream Your Troubles Away)" (Harry Barris, Ted Koehler, Billy Moll) – 3:19
 "And I'll Be There" (A. Bergman, Marilyn Bergman, Dave Grusin) – 3:56
 "Pick Yourself Up" (Dorothy Fields, Jerome Kern) – 2:51
 "Look for the Silver Lining" (Buddy DeSylva, Kern) – 2:54
 "Funny Face" (George Gershwin, Ira Gershwin) – 2:51
 "A Child Is Only a Moment" (Earl Brown) – 3:39
 "Sisters" (Berlin) – 2:44

References 

1997 albums
Rosemary Clooney albums
Concord Records albums